To Kill a Child (Swedish: Att döda ett barn) is a Swedish short film from 1953 that was based on the novella by Stig Dagerman with the same name. The film shows how a man hits a child with his car.

The film was made in the summer of 1952 in Haväng, Skåne, and was first screened on 31 October 1952 in Uppsala Studenternas Filmstudio, but did not officially premiere until 27 August 1953. The film was allowed from 15 years of age and up.

Cast
Karl-Erik Forsgårdh - The Driver
Marie-Anne Condé - The Woman In The Car
Georg Årlin - The Child's Father
Sissi Kaiser - The Child's Mother
Kerstin Thörn - The Child
Sten Larsson - The Man By The Gas Station

Music
Springtime Romance by Rudolf Nelson, instrumental
Nosegay by Walter Joseph, instrumental

External links

References 

Swedish short films
Films based on short fiction
1953 films
Swedish drama films
1953 drama films
Swedish black-and-white films
1953 short films
1950s Swedish-language films
1950s Swedish films